The 2012 Giro d'Italia Femminile, or Giro Donne, was the 23rd running of the Giro d'Italia Femminile, the most prestigious stage race on the women's road cycling calendar. It was held over nine stages from 29 June to 7 July 2012, starting in Naples and finishing in Bergamo. The race was won by last year's winner Marianne Vos, who also won 5 of the 9 stages as well as the yellow jersey (points).

Teams
Seventeen teams competed in the 2012 Giro d'Italia Femminile: the top ten UCI Women's Teams (listed on the left below), a Dutch national team, and six 'wildcard' Italian teams (listed on the right below):

Rabobank Women (Netherlands)
Specialized–lululemon (Germany)
AA Drink–leontien.nl (Netherlands)
Orica–AIS (Australia)
Hitec Products–Mistral Home (Norway)
Diadora–Pasta Zara (Italy)
Be Pink (Italy)
Faren Honda (Italy)
RusVelo (Russia)
Lotto Belisol (Belgium)
Dutch national team
Giusfredi Verinlegno
MCipollini–Giambenini
Vaiano Tepso
Fassa Bortolo Servetto
S.C. Michela Fanini Rox
Forno d'Asolo Colavita

Stages
The 2012 race started with the longest stage, a 139.1 km flat stage from Naples to Terracina. The second stage was a 7.2 km individual time trial around the streets of Rome.

Classification
There were five different jerseys awarded in the 2012 Giro Donne. These followed the same format as those in the men's Giro d'Italia, and as in the men's race, the leader of the general classification received a pink jersey. This classification was calculated by adding the combined finishing times of the riders from each stage, and the overall winner of this classification is considered the winner of the Giro.

The other jerseys differ in colour from those of the men's Giro:
The points classification was awarded the maglia gialla or yellow jersey, a change from its mauve (ciclamino) colour in preceding years. Points are awarded for placements at stage finishes as well as at selected intermediate sprint points on the route, and the jersey is received by the rider with the most overall points to their name.
The mountains classification was awarded the green jersey (maglia verde). Points were allocated for the first few riders over selected mountain passes on the route, with more difficult passes paying more points, and the jersey is received by the rider with the most overall points to their name.
The white jersey (maglia bianca) for the best young rider was given to the highest-placed rider on the general classification aged 23 or under on 1 January 2012 (i.e. born in or after 1989). 
The blue jersey (maglia azzura) was given to the highest-placed Italian rider on the general classification.

Classification progress

General classification progress
Top five with times behind the race leader:

Final standings
Source:

General classification

Points classification

Mountains classification

Young riders classification

References

External links
 (Italian and English)

Giro d'Italia Femminile
2012 in Italian sport
Giro d'Italia Femminile